Impulse is a 1954 British film noir directed by Cy Endfield and starring Arthur Kennedy, Constance Smith and Joy Shelton. It was shot at the Walton Studios near London with sets designed by the art director Wilfred Arnold.

Plot
Alan Curtis (Kennedy), an American estate agent living in England, is dissatisfied with his humdrum life. With his wife Elizabeth (Shelton) on a short break visiting her mother, he gives a lift to sultry nightclub singer Lila (Smith) when he finds her stranded on the road at night. Curtis becomes romantically involved with her and Lila tells him that her brother is in trouble over a jewel robbery.

In reality Lila wants the stolen stones for herself. She tricks the wayward Curtis into believing that he killed a man so that he buys them two tickets out of the country. He decides that it is better to face the music, opting to stay and confess. Lila, too, reconsiders, staying with Curtis until his name is cleared. After the true killers are revealed, Lila goes to jail as a participant in the robbery and Curtis returns to his wife, who forgives him.

Cast
 Arthur Kennedy as Alan Curtis
 Constance Smith as Lila
 Joy Shelton as Elizabeth Curtis
 Jack Allen as Freddie
 James Carney as Jack Forrester
 Cyril Chamberlain as Gray
 Cameron Hall as Joe
 Bruce Beeby as Harry Winters
 Charles Lamb as Palmer 
 Sam Kydd as Ticket Inspector
 Kenneth Cope as Hotel Desk Clerk
 Michael Balfour as Sailor
 John Horsley as Police Officer 
 Peter Swanwick as 	Ship's Captain
 Victor Harrington as 	Nightclub Patron
 Guy Standeven as 	Nightclub Patron
 Jean St. Clair as 	Curtis' Next-Door Neighbor

Critical reception
Film historians Steve Chibnall and Brian McFarlane praised Kennedy's performance and said of Impulse: "This detailed and un-showy study of a man tempted away from a comfortable but dull rut is one of the subtlest to be found in the 'B' film ranks."

References

External links
 
 
 
 

1954 films
British crime drama films
1954 crime drama films
British black-and-white films
Film noir
Films directed by Cy Endfield
Films shot at Nettlefold Studios
1950s English-language films
1950s British films